Shadi Khan was the governor of Mughal emperor Akbar at Kandahar, Afghanistan, at the start of the 17th century. In 1621, more than a decade after Akbar's death, Shadi Khan, with the help of the Abdali Pashtun tribe and opposed by Saddu Khan, allied with  Abbas I of Persia, who had lost Kandahar in 1594 and was intriguing for its recovery.

References

History of Kandahar
Year of birth missing
Year of death missing